Shone is a surname.

Those bearing it include:

 Gwen Alston (née Shone) (1907–1993) British aerodynamicist and educationalist known for work on spinning tunnels and aircraft flight-testing during World War II, and involvement in flight education.
 John D. Shone (fl. 1960s), American physician, eponym of Shone's syndrome
William Shone (British Army officer) (1850–1938), British general
William Shone (footballer) (1857–?), Welsh international footballer
John Shone (1935), British clergyman, dean of the United Diocese of St Andrews, Dunkeld and Dunblane from 1982 to 1989
 Thomas Shone (1784-1868), British, 1820 Settler in South Africa
 Tom Shone (fl. 1990s), British writer
Richard Shone (1949), British art historian
Samuel Shone (1820-1901), Bishop of Kilmore, Elphin and Ardagh from 1884 to 1897
Lowri Shone (1996), English ballerina
Tom Shone, American film critic and writer
George Shone (1922-2009), English footballer
Danny Shone (born 1899),  English association footballer who played as a striker for Liverpool F.C.
Tristan Shone, musician
Sir Terence Shone KCMG (1894-1965) British diplomat who served as the United Kingdom's Minister to Syria and Lebanon from 1944

See also
Shone Tell (1970), Israeli entrepreneur